Maria-Laura Aga (born 23 June 1994) is a Belgian football striker, currently playing for RSC Anderlecht in the Belgian First Division. As an Under-19 international she was Belgium's top scorer in the 2011 U-19 European Championship with 2 goals.

Titles
 1 Belgian league (2011)
 1 Belgian Supercup (2011)
 1 BeNe Super Cup (2011)

References

External links
 

1994 births
Living people
Belgian women's footballers
Belgium women's international footballers
Standard Liège (women) players
PEC Zwolle (women) players
Women's association football forwards
Expatriate women's footballers in the Netherlands
RSC Anderlecht (women) players
Super League Vrouwenvoetbal players
BeNe League players
Belgian expatriate sportspeople in the Netherlands